Vladimir Anatolievich Plyuschev is a Russian professional ice hockey coach. He is currently a head coach of the Kazzinc-Torpedo of the Supreme Hockey League (VHL).

External links
Vladimir Plyuschev's coaching stats at Eliteprospects.com

1955 births
Kazzinc-Torpedo head coaches
Living people
Ice hockey people from Moscow
Russian ice hockey coaches